The Ministry of Economic Affairs (MOEA) is the ministry of the Republic of China (Taiwan) responsible for formulating policy and laws for industry and trade, foreign direct investment, energy, minerals, measurement standards, intellectual property, state-owned enterprises. The ministry is a cabinet level government agency of the Executive Yuan.

The executive agency promotes industrial and economic policies which allows economic activity and growth, increased employment and investments in sector which are critical to Taiwan's economy. Taiwan's main exports are electronics, computers, telecommunications equipment, industrial design services and creative industries/culture.

History

MOEA was initially established in June 1931 as National Economic Council by the Executive Yuan. In December 1931, the council was merged with other organizations to create the Ministry of Basic Industries. In December 1937, the ministry was reorganized as the Ministry of Economic Affairs. The MOEA continued to function in Taiwan since 1949 after the Kuomintang was defeated on the mainland during the Chinese Civil War.

Structure

The Ministry of Economic Affairs is very important in the management of Taiwan's economy. It manages a number of statutory bodies and state owned enterprises.

Staff units
The internal structure of the MOEA:

Department of Mines
Department of Commerce
Department of International Cooperation
Department of Investment Services
Department of Industrial Technology
Department of Statistics
Central Region Office
Southern Taiwan Joint Services Center
Office of Trade Negotiations

Administrative agencies
The Ministry of Economic Affairs is responsible for the entire Taiwanese economy. It has a number of statutory administrative agencies reporting under it. They are:
 Industrial Development Bureau
 Central Region Branch
 Southern Region Branch
 Bureau of Foreign Trade
 Intellectual Property Office
 Bureau of Standards, Metrology and Inspection
 Keelung Branch
 Hsinchu Branch
 Taichung Branch
 Tainan Branch
 Kaohsiung Branch
 Hualien Branch
 Bureau of Energy
 Water Resources Agency
 Small and Medium Enterprise Administration
 Export Processing Zone Administration
 Kaohsiung Export Processing Zone
 Taichung Export Processing Zone
 Chungkang Export Processing Zone
 Pingtung Export Processing Zone
 Central Geological Survey
 State-owned Enterprises Commission
 Investment Commission
 International Trade Commission
 Bureau of Mines

National corporations
The Ministry of Economic Affairs have a number of state owned enterprises reporting to it. They are:
 Taiwan Sugar Corporation
 Taiwan Power Company
 CPC Corporation
 Taiwan Water Corporation

Overseas offices

List of ministers

Pre-1947 Constitution
1928: H. H. Kung
1931: Chen Kung-po (陳公博) [Chen Gongbo]
1935: Wu T’ing-chang (吳鼎昌) [Wu Dingchang]
1937: Ch’eng T’ien-ku (程天固) [Cheng Tiangu]
1938: Wang Wen-ho (翁文灝) [Weng Wenhao]
1946: Wang Yun-wu

Post-1947 Constitution
Political Party:

† Died in office.

Access

The MOEA building is accessible by walking distance West of Guting Station of the Taipei Metro on the Orange Line.

See also
 Executive Yuan
 Economic history of China (1912–49)
 Economy of Taiwan

References

External links

 
 Industrial Professional Assessment System

Economic Affairs
Taiwan
1931 establishments in China
Republic of China, Economic Affairs
Finance in Taiwan